In the Army Now is the seventeenth studio album by the English rock band Status Quo, released on 29 August 1986 by Vertigo Records. Recorded at Chipping Norton Recording Studios in Oxfordshire and Jacobs Studios in Surrey, it was the first album with the post-Live Aid lineup, featuring bassist Rhino Edwards and drummer Jeff Rich, both of whom joined in March 1986.

"I was later told that nobody at the label was interested in a Quo featuring bassist Alan Lancaster and Rick Parfitt," recalled frontman Francis Rossi. "They wanted Parfitt and me. I also learned that unless we did something together, we'd have to pay back a shitload of money... I was adamant that I would never work with Lancaster again, but he warned us that he would injunct us if we tried to do it without him. And when we won he went fucking bananas."

The album contains covers of "In the Army Now", first recorded in 1982 by Dutch duo Rob and Ferdi Bolland, and "Speechless", from ex-Mott the Hoople singer Ian Hunter's 1983 album All of the Good Ones Are Taken.

"The title song was great," Parfitt later observed of the album, "but it had too many fillers."

Track listing

September 2018 2CD Deluxe Edition (CD2, bonus material)
 In the Army Now - Remix
 Lonely - B-Side - 12" of Rollin' Home
 Keep Me Guessing - B-Side - 12" of Rollin' Home
 Don't Give It Up - B-Side of Red Sky
 Heartburn - B-Side - In the Army Now
 Late Last Night - B-Side - In the Army Now
 Long Legged Girls - B-Side - Dreamin'
 Naughty Girl - Single Edit (aka Dreamin')
 Rock N Roll Floorboards - Unreleased B-Side*
 Naughty Girl - Extended (aka Dreamin')
 Dreamin’ - Wet Mix
 In the Army Now -Military Mix
 The Cake Mix
 Overdose – Live*
 Dreamin' – Live*
 Blues Jam – Live*
 La Grange / Rain – Live*

Personnel

Status Quo
Francis Rossi – lead guitar, lead vocals (except 7&11)
Rick Parfitt – guitar, background vocals. lead vocals on 7&11
Jeff Rich – drums
Andrew Bown – keyboards, backing vocals
John "Rhino" Edwards -  bass, backing vocals

Technical
Pip Williams – producer
Dave Edmunds – producer (on "Rollin' Home" and "Red Sky")
Tim 'Ted' Summerhayes – recording engineer (except "Rollin' Home" and "Red Sky")
Simon Sullivan – remix engineer (on "Calling", "In Your Eyes", "Save Me" and "In the Army Now")
Gordon Vicary – mastering (at Townhouse Studios, London)
Mark Wilkinson – sleeve design

Chart positions

Certifications

References

Status Quo (band) albums
1986 albums
Albums produced by Dave Edmunds
Vertigo Records albums